Major-General Sir Edmund Leach  (28 November 1836 – 7 August 1923) was a British army officer.

Early life
Edmund Leach was born at Robeston Wathen, Pembrokeshire, Wales, on 28 November 1836, and educated at Sandhurst.

Career
He started as an Ensign in the 50th Foot, and rose to become a Major-General. He was Colonel of the Queen's Own Royal West Kent Regiment from 1904-21. He was appointed KCB in the 1907 Birthday Honours.

He served in the Crimea and the New Zealand Wars (1863-1866). He was awarded the New Zealand medal.

Personal life

He married Frances Elizabeth Ince at St. Saviour's, Chelsea on 29 April 1869 and had two sons:

Brigadier-General Sir Henry Edmund Burleigh Leach CB CMG CVO (1870-1936)
William Leach (1883–1969)

He lived at Corston House, Pembrokeshire, died at Bath and is buried in Brompton Cemetery, London, on the east side of the main entrance path from the north gate.

References

1836 births
1923 deaths
British Army major generals
Military personnel from Pembrokeshire
Burials at Brompton Cemetery
Knights Commander of the Order of the Bath
Leach family
People from Pembrokeshire
Queen's Own Royal West Kent Regiment officers